Sibiu railway station is the main railway station in Sibiu, Romania.

Services
The station is located near Sibiu city center. In 2008 this station served about 80 domestic trains, along with state-operated trains from Căile Ferate Române. The international trains runs to Budapest (Hungary).

The main domestic lines are
Brașov – Făgăraș – Sibiu – Vințu de Jos – Simeria – Arad – Curtici.
Sibiu –  – Râmnicu Vâlcea – Piatra Olt.
Sibiu – Copșa Mică.

External links
Trains timetable

Railway stations in Romania
Railway stations opened in 1872
Buildings and structures in Sibiu